Matteo Marchisano-Adamo (born February 19, 1973) is an American filmmaker, sound designer, film editor, composer.  He was born in Flint, Michigan.

Biography
Matteo Marchisano-Adamo's mother is Sicilian and his father is from Buenos Aires, Argentina.  As a child he studied ballet, eventually being offered a scholarship to study in New York City, which was never pursued.  Marchisano-Adamo also played the violin as a child.  As a teenager he studied piano with the Brazilian pianist Caio Pagano.

From 1991-1995 Marchisano-Adamo studied music at the Franz Liszt Academy of Music in Budapest, Hungary with Ferenc Rados and Balázs Szokolay.  It was in Budapest that he discovered atonal, electronic music, and serial composition.  György Kurtág, György Ligeti, Karlheinz Stockhausen, La Monte Young, Terry Riley, Steve Reich, and John Cage are some of his influences.

Returning to the U.S. he pursued other creative endeavors, including writing, filmmaking, and poetry.  At the New School University  in New York City he was mentored by the poet Sekou Sundiata.  Attending many screenings at the Anthology Film Archives Marchisano-Adamo was introduced to the film work of Maya Deren and Luis Buñuel.

In Los Angeles, California Marchisano-Adamo attended the American Film Institute as a film editor where he worked with Frank Pierson, Donn Cambern, Danford Greene, Lynzee Klingman, Gill Dennis, and Frank Mazzola.  In 2009 he was awarded best editing from the Europe Independent Film Festival. 
 
He currently lives in Los Angeles, California.

External links 
 
 Film Magic

References

American film editors
1973 births
Living people
American experimental musicians
Experimental composers
American sound artists
American filmmakers
American people of Italian descent
21st-century classical composers
21st-century American composers
Male classical composers
20th-century American composers
20th-century American male musicians
21st-century American male musicians